The Gold Coast 500 (formally known as the Boost Mobile Gold Coast 500) is an annual motor racing event for Supercars, held at the Surfers Paradise Street Circuit in Surfers Paradise, Queensland, Australia.  The event has been a regular part of the Supercars Championship—and its previous iteration, the V8 Supercars Championship—since 2010.

The event was cancelled from the 2020 and 2021 Supercars Championships due to the COVID-19 pandemic, however returned in 2022. Having previously been held as a two-driver event known as the Gold Coast 600, the event was held as a single-driver 500 kilometre race from 2022.

Format
The event is staged over a three-day weekend, from Friday to Sunday. Two thirty-minute practice sessions are held on Friday. Both Saturday and Sunday feature a twenty-minute qualifying session succeeded by a top ten shootout, the combined results of which decide the grid for the following 250 km races.

In 2018, it was proposed that the event format be changed in 2019 to a single 500 kilometre race on the Sunday, with two qualifying races on the Saturday, a format mirroring the Sandown 500. However after the teams refused to back the change, it was dropped.

History

Background

V8 Supercars had previously competed on the Gold Coast as a support race, most recently known as the V8 Supercar Challenge, to the Gold Coast Indy 300 between 1994 and 2008. However, it was only in 2002 that the event attained championship status, having previously been run as exhibition races.

In late 2008, it was announced the IndyCar Series would not be returning to the Gold Coast in 2009, bringing to an end the Indy era. A1 Grand Prix, which had been scheduled to replace IndyCar, then pulled out of the event with only weeks to go, leaving V8 Supercars as the lead category for the first time in the Gold Coast event's history. Subsequently, to fill the last minute hole in the schedule, the 2009 event expanded its format to two 150 km races each on Saturday and Sunday. The number of points accumulated over the two races determined the individual winner for each day. This signalled the commencement of the endurance era at the Gold Coast event.

International co-drivers
In 2010, the track was shortened from 4.47 km to 2.96 km, and the event became known as the Gold Coast 600 for the first time. To differentiate the event, each team was required to have at least one driver of international reputation as a co-driver. In 2011, this rule was adjusted such that every car (as opposed to every team) had a driver of international repute as a co-driver. These drivers could be Australian, but had to have a strong international pedigree, such as Australian IndyCar driver Will Power. Two races of 300 km were held over the weekend, with one on both Saturday and Sunday. As per the other V8 Supercars endurance races, the co-driver was required to complete at least one-third of each race distance (34 laps).

The 2010 event itself was notable for a famous battle between Jamie Whincup and Shane van Gisbergen in which Whincup eventually prevailed to take the win. In 2011, the event was overshadowed by the 2011 IZOD IndyCar World Championship tragedy, which occurred one week before the Gold Coast event. This led to the relaxing of the international driver rules, as Holden Racing Team's planned co-driver Dan Wheldon was killed and Ford Performance Racing co-driver Will Power was injured in the 15-car crash. Brad Jones Racing co-driver Tony Kanaan, a close friend of Wheldon, also decided to withdraw from the Gold Coast event following the tragedy. The International Driver Trophy, introduced in 2010, was renamed in Wheldon's honour before the 2011 event.

Also in 2011, Sébastien Bourdais became the first and only driver to win at Surfers Paradise in both a Champ Car (in 2005 and 2007) and a Supercar (in 2011, and then again in 2012). The 2012 event was notable for two large start-line crashes. In the first of which, international driver Ricky Taylor was tipped into a barrel-roll seconds after the start of the race. The race was red flagged, and would eventually require a third attempt at a start following an incident on the second attempt between Nicolas Minassian and Franck Montagny.

Enduro Cup
For the 2013 event, the requirement for each car to have an international co-driver was removed, due to the increasing costs of hiring overseas drivers. Instead, the event became the third event of the newly formed Pirtek Enduro Cup, along with the series' other two-driver races, the Sandown 500 and the Bathurst 1000. The race format remained the same. In the Sunday race of the 2013 event, David Reynolds took the first win of his V8 Supercars career, driving with Dean Canto. The 2015 event saw another debut win, this time for Jack Perkins, driving with James Courtney for the Holden Racing Team. It was Courtney's return to the sport following nine weeks out with rib and lung injuries suffered in an off-track injury at the Sydney Motorsport Park Super Sprint. In 2016, van Gisbergen won a race at the event for the third consecutive year, driving with French driver Alexandre Prémat, who in winning his first race in Supercars (as the series was now known), joined compatriot Bourdais as a winner at the event.

Chaz Mostert won consecutive Saturday races at the event in 2017 and 2018, driving with Steve Owen and James Moffat respectively. A large thunderstorm hit the circuit during the second 2018 race forcing the abandonment of the race. As less than 50% of the race distance had been completed, no points were awarded. Twelve months later and Mostert wrote off his car in the Saturday top ten shootout, ruling him out for the weekend. Championship leader Scott McLaughlin, who was a chance of sealing the title at the event with two rounds to spare, then had a heavy crash in Sunday qualifying which also ruled him out of the second race. The two races were dominated by Triple Eight Race Engineering with one-two finishes in each race.

The 2020 event was cancelled due to the COVID-19 pandemic.

Back to single-driver event
In its return to the calendar, the event was scheduled as the finale of the 2021 Supercars Championship, to be held in December. The format also changed to two 250 kilometre single-driver races. The event was however cancelled due to COVID-19 and instead held in 2022.

Winners

Multiple winners

By driver

By team

By manufacturer

International Driver (Dan Wheldon Memorial) Trophy
For the years that international co-drivers were mandated for the event, the International Driver Trophy was awarded to the best performing international driver over the race weekend. In 2011, the trophy was renamed after the British IndyCar and Indianapolis 500 champion Dan Wheldon after his death one week prior to the race. The trophy was discontinued after 2012 as a change in regulations saw that international co-drivers were no longer compulsory.

Event sponsors
 2010–13: Armor All Gold Coast 600
 2014: Castrol Edge Gold Coast 600
 2015–16: Castrol Gold Coast 600
 2017–19: Vodafone Gold Coast 600
 2022–: Boost Mobile Gold Coast 500

See also

 Gold Coast Indy 300
 V8 Supercar Challenge
 Surfers Paradise International Raceway
 List of Australian Touring Car Championship races

References 

Supercars Championship races
Recurring sporting events established in 2009
Sport on the Gold Coast, Queensland
Motorsport in Queensland
Culture of Gold Coast, Queensland

es:Gran Premio de Surfers Paradise